The marine molluscs of Sri Lanka are a part of the molluscan wildlife of Sri Lanka.

Land Snails
Phylum: Mollusca  
According to 2006 survey by De Silva, there are 240 marine snails species identified, which belong to four classes out of seven in the world.

Endemic species are highlighted with an asterisk (*).

Class: Gastropoda

Family: Amathinidae 
 Amathina tricarinata

Family: Psammobiidae 
 Asaphis deflorata

Family: Buccinidae 
 Pollia undosa

Family: Muricidae 
 Chicoreus brunneus

Family: Conidae 
 Conus figulinus

Family: Dentaliidae 
 Dentalium

Family: Ficidae 
 Ficus

Family: Ampullinidae 
 Globularia fluctuata

Family: Mesodesmatidae 
 Mesodesma glabratum

Family: Buccinidae 
 Phalium decussatum

Family: Tellinidae 
 Pharaonella

Family: Terebridae 
 Duplicaria raphanula
 Terebra commaculata
 Terebra

Family: Tonnidae 
 Tonna luteostoma

Family: Cardiidae 
 Vasticardium assimile
 Vasticardium rubicundum

Family: Mytilidae 
 Perna virdis

Family: Chamidae 
 Chama brassica

Family: Pectinidae 
 Chlamys

Family: Cypraeidae 
 Cypraea

Family: Trochidae 
 Trochus radiatus

Family  
 Antigona lamellaris

Family: Muricidae 
 Thais rudolpi

Family: Nacellidae 
 Cellana radiata

Family: Mytilidae 
 Mytilus crassitestatus

Family: Veneridae 
 Dosinia
 Pitar hebracea
 Pitar sulfureum
 Sunetta

Family 
 Afrocardium latum

Family: Mactridae 
 Mactra turgida

Family: Cardiidae 
 Cerastoderma glaucum

Family 
 Lactona incarnata

Class: Polyplacophora 
 Chiton

See also
 List of non-marine molluscs of Sri Lanka

References

External links
 Utilization of molluscs as a food resource among traditional communities in Kalpitiya Region (KR) of Sri Lanka.
 The National Red List 2012 of Sri Lanka

Marine molluscs

Lists of biota of Sri Lanka
Sri Lanka
Sri Lanka